Entra ASA is a Norwegian real estate company, headquartered in Oslo, Norway and is as of 22.06.2020 19.25% state owned.

Operations 
The company was founded in 2000 when all commercial real estate owned by the state through Statsbygg was transferred to Entra. The company manages 1.2 million square meters in 128 buildings.

Entra's main purpose is to provide premises to meet central government needs and to operate on commercial principles. In addition, Entra is also able to serve municipal and private customers. Entra Eiendom has  about 175 employees and is based in Oslo.

Management 
Chief executive officer from 2008 to 2012 was Kyrre Olaf Johansen. In 2012 Rune Olsø was hired as acting chief executive, later on a permanent basis, but he resigned after a short time. Anne Harris became acting chief executive throughout the year.

Chief executive officer from January 2013 is Klaus-Anders Nysteen.

References

External links
This is Entra
 Entra

Real estate companies of Norway
Real estate companies established in 2000
Companies based in Oslo
2000 establishments in Norway
Companies listed on the Oslo Stock Exchange